United States gubernatorial elections were held in 1801, in 13 states.

Eight governors were elected by popular vote and five were elected by state legislatures.

Results

See also 
1801 United States elections

References

Notes

Bibliography